Roberto Carretero defeated Àlex Corretja in the final, 2–6, 6–4, 6–4, 6–4 to win the singles tennis title at the 1996 Hamburg European Open.

Andriy Medvedev was the defending champion, but lost in the second round to Jordi Burillo.

Seeds
A champion seed is indicated in bold text while text in italics indicates the round in which that seed was eliminated.  The top eight seeds received a bye to the second round.

Draw

Finals

Top half

Section 1

Section 2

Bottom half

Section 3

Section 4

References
 Official results archive (ATP)
 Official results archive (ITF)

1996 ATP Tour